Al-Qādisiyyah is a historical city in southern Mesopotamia, southwest of al-Hillah and al-Kūfah in Iraq. It is most famous as the site of the Battle of al-Qādisiyyah in c. 636, which saw a force of Arab-Muslim invaders defeat a larger army sent by the Sasanian Empire.

Commercial importance
Prior to the Arab conquest, al-Qādisiyyah was but a small village on the western side of the Euphrates River, near an old castle at `Udhayb, and was possibly part of the Wall of the Arabs (Iranica, al-Qadisiyyah). However, during the centuries that followed, al-Qādisiyyah grew in size and importance and was a noted stop along very important highways of commerce that led to Baghdād and Makkah (see Alavi, 100).

History 

Al-Qādisiyyah was the scene of a decisive battle in the conquest of Persia by the Arabs around 636. The Muslim troops of the caliph `Omar led by Sa`d ibn Abī Waqqās despite their outnumbered forces defeated the army of the Sassanid emperor Yazdgard III, led by Rostam Farrokhzād.

Another historical Qādisiyyah
Another Qādisiyyah existed on the Tigris River, off the road between Baghdād and Sāmarrā', not very far from the Euphrates city. Both cities are recorded in the geographies of Ibn Khordadbeh (see Barthold, 202).

References
Alavi, S M Ziauddin. Arab geography in the Ninth and Tenth Centuries. Aligarh: The Department of Geography Aligarh Muslim University, 1965.
Barthold, Wilhelm (Vasilii Vladimirovich Bartol‘d). An historical geography of Iran. Edited and translated into English by Svat Soucek. Princeton: Princeton University Press, 1984.

Notes

Qadisiyyah
Medieval Iraq